Luigi Bonelli (1892–1954) was an Italian playwright and screenwriter.

Selected filmography
 Paradise (1932)
 Palio (1932)
Nini Falpala (1933)
 Ginevra degli Almieri (1935)
 Territorial Militia (1935)
 The Man Who Smiles (1936)
 Lucrezia Borgia (1940)
 Boccaccio (1940)
 Rossini (1942)
 Souls in Turmoil (1942)
 The Adventures of Fra Diavolo (1942)
 The Iron Swordsman (1949)
 Captain Demonio (1950)
 The Captain of Venice (1951)
 Tragic Spell (1951)
 The Angels of the District (1952)
 Redemption (1952)
 The Angel of Sin (1952)

References

Bibliography
 Goble, Alan. The Complete Index to Literary Sources in Film. Walter de Gruyter, 1999.

External links

1892 births
1954 deaths
20th-century Italian screenwriters
People from Siena
Italian male screenwriters
20th-century Italian male writers